Isaac A. Packer Farm is a historic home and farm complex located at Woodward Township in Clinton County, Pennsylvania. The farmhouse was built in 1885, and is a -story, "L"-shaped stone dwelling in the Victorian Gothic style.  The house is built of sandstone in hues of purple and gray. Also on the property are a contributing three-story bank barn (1905), a stone lime kiln, and a well (1886).

It was listed on the National Register of Historic Places in 1991.

References

External links
 Isaac A. Packer Farm, Legislative Route 18011, 2.4 miles northwest of Jay Street Bridge (Farrandville Road), Lock Haven vicinity, Clinton, PA: 4 photos, 10 data pages, and 2 photo caption pages at Historic American Buildings Survey
 Isaac A. Packer Farm, Farm House, Legislative Route 18011, 2.4 miles northwest of Jay Street Bridge (Farrandsville Road), Lock Haven vicinity, Clinton, PA: 14 photos, 10 data pages, and 4 photo caption pages at Historic American Buildings Survey

Historic American Buildings Survey in Pennsylvania
Houses on the National Register of Historic Places in Pennsylvania
Gothic Revival architecture in Pennsylvania
Houses completed in 1885
Houses in Clinton County, Pennsylvania
National Register of Historic Places in Clinton County, Pennsylvania
Lime kilns in the United States